San Francisco de Borja is one of the 67 municipalities of Chihuahua, in northern Mexico. The municipal seat lies at San Francisco de Borja.

As of 2010, the municipality had a total population of 2,290, up from 2,243 as of 2005.

As of 2010, the town of San Francisco de Borja had a population of 1,157. Other than the town of San Francisco de Borja, the municipality had 81 localities, none of which had a population over 1,000.

References

Municipalities of Chihuahua (state)